Easy2Sync for Files is backup and file synchronization software created for use with the Microsoft Windows environments. It allows backing up and synchronizing files between two folder trees on the same or different drives / computers, including network and USB drives and FTP servers.

Features
 It has the capability to remember the previous state of directories in a database, and thus also synchronize deletions. It can also detect renamed directories.
 The program fully supports Unicode characters so that it can copy filenames in all languages.
 Includes a scheduler.
 Supports the sync over FTP.
 Versioning, the ability to keep multiple older versions of each file in the backup.
 Files / folders can be excluded from the sync by name, age or size.
 Includes modes to (instead of synchronizing) copy, move or delete files or to flatten a directory structure into a single directory.
 The program can be installed onto portable drives (USB)

See also 
File synchronization
Backup

References

External links
 http://www.easy2sync.com

Easy2Sync for Files